Chahinez or Chahnez is a given name. Notable people with the name include:

Amina Chahinez Hemour (born 1983), Algerian footballer
Chahinez Nasri (born 1996), Tunisian race walker
Chahnez M'barki (born 1981), Tunisian judoka

See also
Shahnaz